The Happos Family is a 3D CGI animated series developed by Patricia Hidalgo and produced by Ferrero, Spider Eye Productions, and Cyber Group Studios for Turner Broadcasting System EMEA.

Synopsis 
The series is about a family of hippos called Happo. This family lives in a safari park in Africa. They just laze and rumble during the day, but once they arrive at closing time and each visitor leaves the park, the Happo family begins the real fun. Members of the family include Astro Happo, who wants to travel to the moon at all costs, Stunt Happo, who draws attention to himself with his accident-prone stunts, and Party Happo, who is there to party.

Episodes

References

External links
 https://www.boomerangtv.co.uk/shows/the-happos-family
 https://www.cartoonito.co.uk/tv-show/the-happos-family

2010s British animated television series
2016 British television series debuts
2018 British television series endings
2010s French animated television series
2016 French television series debuts
2018 French television series endings
2016 Italian television series debuts
Animated television series about families
Animated television series without speech
Boomerang (TV network) original programming
British children's animated comedy television series
British computer-animated television series
Cartoonito original programming
French children's animated comedy television series
French computer-animated television series
Italian children's animated comedy television series
Italian computer-animated television series
Television shows scored by Natalie Holt